Morro Branco is a low mountain in the northwest of the island of São Vicente. Its elevation is 86 m. It stands at the western end of the Porto Grande Bay, 4 km west of the city centre of Mindelo. In the 1920s 
military installations were built on the mountain.

See also
Geography of Cape Verde

References

Headlands of Cape Verde
Branco